The Lionel Hampton Art Tatum Buddy Rich Trio is a 1955 album by Lionel Hampton, Art Tatum and Buddy Rich for Norman Granz' Clef Records.  The album has been re-issued on Verve as Tatum Hampton Rich and by Pablo as The Tatum Hampton Rich Trio and as Volume three of Pablo's series, The Tatum Group Masterpieces.

The music was recorded on August 1, 1955, at Radio Recorders, Los Angeles; the album was produced by Norman Granz. Later releases added previously unreleased tracks and alternative takes.

Track listing 
LP side A
"What Is This Thing Called Love" (Cole Porter) – 7:02
"I'll Never Be the Same" (Frank Signorelli, Matty Malneck, Gus Kahn) – 6:37
"Makin' Whoopee" (Walter Donaldson, Gus Kahn) – 7:04
LP side B
"Hallelujah" (Vincent Youmans, Leo Robin, Clifford Grey) – 4:53
"Perdido" (Juan Tizol, Hans Lengsfelder, Ervin Drake) – 5:03
"More Than You Know" (Vincent Youmans, Billy Rose, Edward Eliscu) – 4:13
"How High the Moon" (Nancy Hamilton, Morgan Lewis) – 5:06

Releases 
Clef MGC 709
Verve MGV 8093
Pablo 2310 720
Pablo PACD 2405 426 2

Personnel 
Lionel Hampton – vibraphone
Art Tatum – piano
Buddy Rich – drums

References

External links
Clef records discography at jazzdisco.org

1955 albums
Lionel Hampton albums
Art Tatum albums
Buddy Rich albums
Albums produced by Norman Granz
Clef Records albums
Verve Records albums
Pablo Records albums